The Dark may refer to:

 Darkness, the absence of light

Radio, film and television
 "The Dark", a 1937 episode of the radio drama Lights Out
 recreated on the 1962 Arch Oboler album Drop Dead! An Exercise in Horror
 The Dark (1979 film), science fiction horror film directed by John Cardos
 The Dark, a 1993 film featuring Jaimz Woolvett
 The Dark (2005 film), a British-German horror film starring Sean Bean
 The Dark (2018 film), an Austrian horror film

Literature
 The Dark (Curley novel), a 2003 novel by Marianne Curley
 The Dark (Herbert novel), a 1980 novel by James Herbert
 The Dark (McGahern novel), a 1965 novel by John McGahern
 The Dark (magazine), a magazine published by Sean Wallace
 The Dark, a series of comics published in the 1990s by Continüm Comics
 The Dark, a play by Charlotte Jones

Music
 The Dark (Guy Clark album), 2002
 The Dark (Metal Church album)
 "The Dark", a song by Caro Emerald from the EP Emerald Island
 "The Dark", a song featured on the Trans-Siberian Orchestra's album Beethoven's Last Night
 "The Dark", a song by Simon Curtis featuring Jay-Z from 8Bit Heart
 "The Dark", a punk band from London who recorded with Fresh Records

Other uses
 The Dark (Magic: The Gathering), an expansion card set for the game Magic: The Gathering
 The Dark, a fictional character in the role-playing game Villains and Vigilantes; basis for the comics series (see above)
 Brendan Hughes or "The Dark" (1948–2008), Irish republican

See also
 
 Dark (disambiguation)